Kirkland Junction is a populated place situated in Yavapai County, Arizona, United States. Like nearby Kirkland, Kirkland Junction was named after William Kirkland, one of the first settlers of the area.

References

Populated places in Yavapai County, Arizona